William James "Botchy" Connors (July 26, 1891 – June 24, 1961) was an American politician.

Career
Born in Chicago, Illinois, Connors was an active member of the Democratic Party. In 1932, Connors was elected to the Illinois House of Representatives; in 1934, he was elected to the Illinois State Senate, where he served until his death.

Death
Connors died of uremia in Chicago in 1961.

Notes

1891 births
1961 deaths
Politicians from Chicago
Democratic Party Illinois state senators
Democratic Party members of the Illinois House of Representatives
20th-century American politicians